Hyllie Station is a railway station located in the Hyllie city district in the southwestern part of Malmö, Sweden. It is the final station on the Swedish side of the Öresund Line before trains pass the Øresund Bridge towards Denmark.

The station opened in 2010 as a part of the newly built City Tunnel along with Triangeln railway station and a new underground part of Malmö Central Station.

The station is located next to Malmö Arena and the Emporia shopping mall and is being served by Øresundståg regional trains and Pågatågen commuter trains. It is an important hub for regional bus services to/from Trelleborg, Vellinge, Skanör and Falsterbo. Many companies, including Skanska, also have offices in the station area.

Border control 

Since 12 November 2015 the Swedish Police perform ID checks on passengers on incoming Øresundståg trains from Denmark via Copenhagen Airport, in response to the European migrant crisis. Trains arriving in Hyllie have to wait around 15 minutes to be cleared for departure. For Swedish and Nordic citizens, a government-issued ID like a driver's license should suffice. For citizens outside the European Union, Norway and Switzerland, a passport and a permit to travel freely within the EU, like a residence permit, should suffice.

References

City Tunnel
Railway stations in Malmö
Buildings and structures in Malmö
Railway stations opened in 2010
21st-century establishments in Skåne County
Transit centers in Sweden